Sunset in My Hometown is a 2018 South Korean drama film and the thirteenth feature film directed by Lee Joon-ik. The film stars Park Jeong-min and Kim Go-eun.

Cast
Park Jeong-min as Hak-soo, an unsuccessful rapper in Seoul who returns to his long-abandoned hometown of Byeonsan in the countryside following a phone call from home.
Kim Go-eun as Sun-mi, Hak-soo's childhood classmate.
Jang Hang-sun as Hak-soo's father
Go Jun as Yong-dae
Kang Hyun-goo as Young Yong-dae
Shin Hyun-bin as Mi-kyung
Jung Kyu-soo as Sun-mi's father
Kim Jun-han as Won-joon
Bae Jae-ki as Sang-ryul 
Choi Jeong-heon as Goo-bok
Im Seong-jae as Seok-gi
Andup as himself
Song Duk-ho as Rapper
Cha Soon-bae as doctor

Production
Production began in Seoul on September 11, 2017. Filming wrapped in Chuncheon, Gangwon Province on November 18, 2017.

Release
Sunset in My Hometown opened in local theaters on July 4, 2018.

Reception 
Yoon Min-sik of The Korea Herald praised the characters and dialogue for being charming and natural; as well as the chemistry between lead actors Park and Kim. Shim Sun-ah of Yonhap News Agency praised the film for being heartwarming, inspiring and humorous.

Awards and nominations

References

External links

Sunset in My Hometown at Naver Movies 

2018 films
South Korean musical drama films
2010s musical drama films
Films directed by Lee Joon-ik
2018 drama films
2010s South Korean films